PAW Patrol: The Movie is a 2021 Canadian computer-animated action-adventure comedy film based on the television series PAW Patrol created by Keith Chapman. The film was produced by Spin Master Entertainment, the toy company behind the series, with animation provided by Mikros Image, and released by Paramount Pictures and Nickelodeon Movies. The events of the film take place during the eighth season of the series. It is directed by Cal Brunker, who co-wrote the screenplay with Billy Frolick and Bob Barlen from a story by Frolick. The film was the first of several planned films produced under the Spin Master Entertainment banner. Several cast members from the original series reprised their roles, including Kingsley Marshall (voicing Marshall), Keegan Hedley (voicing Rubble), Shayle Simons (voicing Zuma), Lilly Bartlam (voicing Skye) and Ron Pardo (voicing both Cap'n Turbot and Mayor Humdinger). They are joined by newcomers Iain Armitage, Marsai Martin, Yara Shahidi, Kim Kardashian, Randall Park, Dax Shepard, Tyler Perry,  Jimmy Kimmel, and introducing Will Brisbin in his film debut as Ryder. In the film, Ryder and the PAW Patrol pups are called to Adventure City to stop the recently-elected Mayor Humdinger from turning the bustling metropolis into a state of chaos to face the challenge in order to save its citizens.

Ronnen Harary announced that Spin Master was "currently considering whether to extend the PAW Patrol franchise into feature films at some point in the next 12 to 24 months" in November 2017. Development for the feature film based on PAW Patrol television series began in February 2020, with Brunker attached to direct, and Barlen and Frolick attached to write the screenplay. From October 2020 to May 2021, the voice casting call began. Production was done remotely in both the United States and Canada during the COVID-19 pandemic. The film was produced almost entirely in Canada; according to Brunker, "95 percent of everything" happened in Canada, with the exception being some audio recording.

PAW Patrol: The Movie premiered at the Vue Leicester Square in London on August 8, 2021. It was theatrically released in the United Kingdom and Ireland one day later before it was released in both Canada and the United States on August 20, 2021. It was also made available on Paramount+ on the same day. The film received generally positive reviews from critics, who praised its animation, themes, characterization, soundtrack and action sequences, but were polarized with the humor, which was praised by some and criticized by others for having to rely on the show’s merchandising arm, and also criticized its screenplay and pacing. It also became a box office success, grossing over $144 million worldwide against a production budget of $26 million. 

A sequel, titled PAW Patrol: The Mighty Movie, is scheduled to be released on September 29, 2023, featuring elements from the Mighty Pups sub-theme of the main show.

Plot
In Adventure Bay, a truck driver named Gus crashes while trying to avoid a baby sea turtle and hangs over the town's suspension bridge. Cap'n Turbot comes across the scene while preparing to move the Flounder to another spot and calls Ryder, who sends the PAW Patrol pups, Marshall, Rubble, Chase, Rocky, Zuma, and Skye, into action. Chase manages to save Gus, revealing his truck is leaking maple syrup. He and Ryder bring the baby sea turtle back to its family.

Meanwhile in Adventure City, the PAW Patrol's arch-nemesis Mayor Humdinger has recently been elected mayor (although it pointed out that he was the only candidate on the ballot after the leading candidate suddenly dropped out). Knowing of Humdinger's infamous wrongdoings from Foggy Bottom, a dachshund named Liberty calls and begs the team to come to Adventure City to help keep the people safe from Mayor Humdinger. When the team is ready to go, but Chase refuses to go due to having a "history" in Adventure City when he was a young pup after he was abandoned by his previous owners, and the city was so big and he was so small. Ryder convinces him to go back while Chase reluctantly gives him his trust. The team is heading on a road trip to Adventure City, they arrived and get settled into their new satellite headquarters.

Meanwhile, Humdinger uses a Cloud Catcher device to clear up the weather so he can do his firework show. The show goes haywire and the team is alerted. They suited up and grab their vehicles to rush straight into a traffic jam, but Liberty arrives and guides them through alleyways and back streets to get to City Hall. They manage to take care of the situation, but Chase fails to save some people who are then rescued by Marshall instead. An infuriated Humdinger tells his henchmen Butch and Ruben to get rid of the PAW Patrol by any means necessary. That night, Chase keeps dwelling over his mistake while the next morning, Liberty reveals her first time helping her heroes like she's an honorary member of the team.

The next day, Humdinger builds an extension to the subway line with several inversions similar to a roller coaster  loop-de-loop section called the "Humdinger Hyperloop". It breaks and traps the passengers upside-down. The pups race to rescue them, but Chase freezes when his fear gets the best of him. Marshall manages to get the people down with his ladder while Skye goes to pick up Chase from the rooftop. Ryder suggests Chase should take a break from his duties, but this greatly hurts him and causes him to run away out of heartbreak after accusing Ryder of breaking his trust and giving up on him when things get difficult, hurting Ryder's feelings in response. Chase gets captured by Butch and Ruben and is taken to Fuzzy Buddies obedience school (which was turned into a dog pound) where he meets his fellow inmates Delores, Barney, Harris, and Rocket. While searching for Chase, Liberty and Ryder discover that numerous dogs have gone missing and he links them to Humdinger. Liberty gets captured on purpose and is taken to the obedience school where she encourages and rescues Chase while the other dogs then chase Butch and Ruben. The team is heading away from the obedience school and decides to split up.

On the way back to HQ, Ryder takes Chase to the street crossing intersection where he saved his life. Ryder explains to Chase that he chose to save him, not out of pity, but because he was the bravest pup he ever met. Chase's collar is returned to him, as Ryder asks him to go to work and Chase agrees that he will resume his duties and rejoins the team. Meanwhile, the Cloud Catcher has gone critical and its creator Kendra Wilson confronts Humdinger. He destroys the remote and reveals his building called Humdinger Heights. The Cloud Catcher unleashes weeks’ worth of bad weather into the sky, causing a massive hurricane over Adventure City and the citizens are in big danger. When Kendra calls the team for help, they deployed and grab their vehicles to be ready for launch, and Liberty then receives her own vehicle from Ryder, a three-wheeled scooter with a speed-booster (which was replaced by her wagon as a vehicle with a busted wheel) and her uniform (minus her collar and pup tag), temporarily joining the team. The team race to Humdinger Heights and forces them to improvise. Chase managed to save the citizens from the flying vehicles, while Marshall, Rocky, and Rubble work to keep the citizens inside Humdinger Heights, Zuma and Liberty go to the canals to save a family from a drowning car, and Skye flies into the air to stop the Cloud Catcher.

Ryder takes the elevator to the top office and saves Humdinger by forcing him on an elevator and dropping him faster to the ground floor. He resorts to rappelling down the elevator shaft, but the storm destroys the tower and he is trapped in the building when it falls down. A horrified Chase notices that Ryder's in danger, he rushes and drives up to save him and sees Ryder's light from the other side of the building. When he runs towards the other side, Chase realizes that there is a large gap between him and Ryder. Choosing to launch his grappling hook to the other side, Chase almost gets pulled from the tower when the wind causes his pup pack to malfunction and nearly make him fall, forcing him to disengage his pup pack to save himself. Feeling his fear coming back, Chase remembers what Ryder said to him before, letting out a heroic scream and taking a leap of faith, and manages to make it across to the other side. Having made it to the far side, Chase sees Ryder pinned under the debris and works with him to get him free. After that, they share a moment and later leave the building while Skye destroys the Cloud Catcher in a kamikaze-style attack, sacrificing her helicopter (which is transformed into her jet) before it crashes and she flies back down to the city. After this, the skies are clear and sunny again, Chase and Ryder come out of the building and the pups are relieved to see them safe. Ryder is proud of his team and the citizens emerge from the building congratulating them for a job well done. Chase then catches Mayor Humdinger and places him under arrest for gross negligence, public endangerment, and "dognapping". While Humdinger tries to escape, he is stopped by Skye's mini-drone with his pants accidentally being ripped off and reveals his underpants.

The following day, the team is hailed as heroes and given the key to Adventure City in a major ceremony by Kendra and Adventure City News reporter Marty Muckraker. Liberty enters the stage and becomes an official member of the team, finally fulfilling her aspirations of doing so, and is given her own collar and pup tag. Ryder begins to make a speech about how they will always be there for Adventure City, but gets interrupted by a call from Harris, one of the dogs from the obedience school, saying there is another emergency down at the waterfront. Chase declares to Ryder that he and the pups are ready, the PAW Patrol then grabs their vehicles and drives off to the rescue together.

During the credits, Mayor Humdinger and the Catastrophe Crew are shown to have been apprehended and detained for their crimes throughout the movie while being removed from the city mayoral office, the Cloud Catcher has been rebuilt, and Butch and Ruben are riding a tandem bicycle while pulling a cart full of cats.

Voice cast
 Will Brisbin as Ryder, a 10-year-old boy who serves as the leader of the PAW Patrol. With his leadership, Ryder confidently sends the group on their mission to save Adventure City from dog-hating Mayor Humdinger and also having a complicated relationship with Chase. Brisbin had to keep his role a closely-guarded secret for some time, pretty difficult given his nine-year-old brother is a huge PAW Patrol fan. Brisbin replaces Beckett Hipkiss from the series.
 Iain Armitage as Chase, an ambitious 7-year-old German shepherd who serves as a police pup and the main protagonist of the film. He grew up on the streets of Adventure City, giving him a "strong character arc for the film". He suffers an anxiety attack in the middle of a rescue in Adventure City due to his strongly dislike of "heights" because of the larger buildings, but later he conquered his fears to save Ryder by taking a leap of faith, after realizing that he is the bravest pup of the team. Armitage also found the role special and enjoyable. He said, "It's a new challenge because you don’t get to convey anything with your body movements… that’s all the animator’s job," then he explained: "You can only use your voice to convey whatever you’re trying to show. But it’s really fun to do animation." Armitage replaces Justin Kelly from the series.
 Marsai Martin as Liberty, a spirited long-haired dachshund who grew up and lives in Adventure City and becomes the newest member of the PAW Patrol. She considers the team are her heroes and works hard to keep the city clean, she also dreams to become the team's member before joining them. She is outspoken and often snarks at other people. Martin said this particular role was unique because it hits close to home. Martin expressed the feelings about her role, "She's so wild and a free spirit. She's so energetic and fun, and I feel like she'd actually make a perfect fit into the PAW Patrol because of how amazing and wild she is."
 Ron Pardo as:
 Mayor Humdinger, the PAW Patrol's arch-nemesis from Foggy Bottom who is elected the mayor of nearby Adventure City. Though Humdinger despises the PAW Patrol pups, he has shown a general dislike for dogs in general because he prefers cats. He was willing to threaten a university to shut down for the Cloud Catcher to do his firework show and to abuse subordinates, citizens and technology for his own goals, refusing to take responsibility for his mishaps. Despite being enemies, Ryder still chooses to rescue Mayor Humdinger from danger. Pardo said he drew inspiration for Mayor Humdinger's voice from mixing impressions of a "Dudley Do-Right" cartoon character with a well-known American entertainer from the 1930s-1950s.
 Cap'n Turbot, an animal expert and one of the PAW Patrol's closest friends who calls Ryder and PAW Patrol pups when he hears about Gus' help.
 Yara Shahidi as Dr. Kendra Wilson, a scientist who works at a university. She invented the Cloud Catcher, a tool that Mayor Humdinger was used to clear the weather cloud and PAW Patrol would use it in their mission. Kendra tries to warn Mayor Humdinger about the machine unleashing a week's load of bad weather, but Humdinger destroys her remote. She called the PAW Patrol to stop the Cloud Catcher from threatening the Adventure City.
 Kim Kardashian as Delores, a sassy poodle who is working on an animal shelter after being jailed in the Fuzzy Buddies obedience school. Perfectly groomed and posh, she aids the PAW Patrol with their mission. Kim Kardashian has expressed her excitement over her role in the film. Kardashian shared the trailer and wrote on her Instagram and Twitter: "I'm so excited for you guys to hear me play Delores in PAW Patrol: The Movie!". She has been excited to voice the part, thrilled that her children now consider her a "cool mom."
 Randall Park as Butch, a burly man and one of Mayor Humdinger's security guards who attempted to keep the pups out of Adventure City. He is a harsh security guard where Mayor Humdinger tells him and Ruben to get rid of the dogs, especially the PAW Patrol pups. At the mayor's request, Butch does not let any dogs into the mayor's press conference, but cats are allowed. Butch is usually the one who gives Mayor Humdinger a replacement hat when it gets lost or destroyed.
 Dax Shepard as Ruben, a thin man and one of Mayor Humdinger's security guards who attempted to keep the pups out of Adventure City. Along with Butch, he got requested by Mayor Humdinger to get rid of the dogs and bring them to the obedience school. On voicing his character role, Shepard stated that PAW Patrol "was the first show he was forced to watch after becoming a dad but admitted that he actually enjoys it", adding: "that earned him some serious cred with his kids". He concluded: "I get to reintroduce my kids to that experience of going to the movies that I valued so much growing up".
 Tyler Perry as Gus, a truck driver in the midst of transporting maple syrup to its destination who is saved by Chase after his truck swerves off a bridge to avoid hitting the baby sea turtle in the middle of the road. Perry, on his role, saying that his 6-year-old son Aman is also thrilled that his father is involved in the movie. "He loves Skye and Chase and Zuma. I know the theme song like the back of my mind," he stated in an interview. "...That's the reason I said yes. I really wanted to be a part of something that he could appreciate as much as I do."
 Jimmy Kimmel as Marty Muckraker, the news anchor of the Adventure City News Network who wears a wig. Kimmel also had trouble convincing his kids, 4-year-old Billy and 7-year-old Jane, of his role in the film. "I have been telling them, trying to explain to them that Daddy's in the Paw Patrol movie," the late-night host jokes. "I'm hopeful this will make me a big shot, at least for a couple of days."
 Keegan Hedley as Rubble, a wisecracking 5-year-old bulldog who serves as a construction pup. He becomes the main comic relief character in the film as opposed to the series, so Hedley was encouraged to make up his own dialogue during recording. After recording, director Cal Brunker says that his personality is a mix of Disney/Pixar comic-relief sidekicks such as The Seven Dwarfs, Jiminy Cricket, the Genie, Timon and Pumbaa, Mushu, Dory, Mater, Olaf, and Ducky and Bunny, he gives him a personality change from being a tough pup to a funny comic-relief character in this movie.
 Lilly Bartlam as Skye, a sweet 7-year-old cockapoo who serves as an aviator pup.
 Kingsley Marshall as Marshall, a cuddly 6-year-old Dalmatian who serves as a firefighting pup.
 Callum Shoniker as Rocky, a clever 6-year-old Mixed-breed who serves as a recycling pup. Shoniker replaces Jackson Reid from the series.
 Shayle Simons as Zuma, a energetic 5-year-old chocolate Labrador retriever who serves as an aquatic rescue pup.
 Kim Roberts as Mayor Goodway, the Mayor of Adventure Bay.
 Paul Braunstein as a tough guy on a subway, Liberty scolds him for littering. Richard Arnold voices the tough guy in the UK dub.
 Neil Crone as Tony, the proprietor of his Grocery Store.
 Monique Alvarez as Carmen, a woman who works at Tony's Grocery Store.
 Jamillah Ross as a camerawoman working for Marty Muckracker.
 Josh Robert Thompson as the fireworks technician that Mayor Humdinger enlisted to pull of his fireworks show.
 Josh Graham as the computer voice that is heard in the PAW Patrol's vehicles and their satellite headquarters in Adventure City.
 Joe Pingue as Barney, an Old English Sheepdog and inmate at Fuzzy Buddies obedience school.
 Charles Gallant as Harris, a Labrador Retriever and inmate at Fuzzy Buddies obedience school. Ronan Keating provides the voice of Harris in the UK dub.
 Richard Binsley as Rocket, a Jack Russell Terrier and inmate at Fuzzy Buddies obedience school who often chases his tail. Tom Fletcher provides the voice of Rocket in the UK dub.
 Raoul Bhaneja as Dad
 Saara Chaudry as Daughter
 Kevin Duhaney as Window Washer
 Eva Olivia as:
 Chickaletta, Mayor Goodway's pet chicken.
 The Kitten Catastrophe Crew, Mayor Humdinger's cat minions and PAW Patrol's feline counterparts.
 Several additional animal vocal effects.

The film also has a select amount of side characters from the series making (though not part of the main cast) non-speaking cameo appearances including Francois Turbot, Mr. Porter, Katie, Farmer Al, Farmer Yumi and Alex Porter.

Production

Development
In November 2017, Ronnen Harary confirmed that Spin Master was "currently considering whether to extend the PAW Patrol franchise into feature films at some point in the next 12 to 24 months." Animation tests were conducted in 2017 to measure how the characters "would translate onto the big screen" and the company developed a film script.

Development of the film was confirmed on February 21, 2020, with Cal Brunker attached as director while Spin Master Entertainment's president, Jennifer Dodge serves as the film's producer. Production was done in both the United States and Canada. On March 13, 2021, an exclusive first look of the film was shown during the Nickelodeon Kids' Choice Awards 2021.
 
Dodge stated that they were excited about the partnership with Paramount Pictures and Nickelodeon Movies to bring the franchise to the big screen. She adds, "This first foray into the arena of feature film marks a significant strategic expansion for Spin Master Entertainment and our properties. This demonstrates our commitment to harnessing our own internal entertainment production teams to develop and deliver IP in a motion picture format and allows us to connect our characters to fans through shared theatrical experiences."

Dodge said, "For us, it was important to be able to tell a deeper character story than what they've been able to do with the series." She also explained, "And to tell it in a way that a child really can understand and relate to, and maybe even their parents get a deeper meaning from it. You can have a hard day at school or daycare and you can rise above those difficulties and you can come through on the other side. It doesn't mean you're never scared, it doesn't mean you don't doubt yourself. But, if at the end of the day, you really believe in yourself and you have people around you who believe in you, you can overcome it."

"When the chance came to pitch my take on the movie, I was able to bring all of their experience and what my kids loved about the show to the pitch, and I think that really helped," says Brunker. "Our take was, we really wanted to build this around the emotional journey of one character, so it felt like more of a theatrical experience. You go on a journey with one of these characters overcoming their struggles, and the whole team is involved, but we felt that that was the best way to bring an audience deeper into the story."

Casting

On October 15, 2020, Iain Armitage, Marsai Martin, Yara Shahidi, Kim Kardashian, Randall Park, Dax Shepard, Tyler Perry, Jimmy Kimmel were announced as part of the cast. On May 3, 2021, the cast and characters were announced. Adam Levine, Perry and Kardashian joined the cast because their respective children were fans of the show. For the role of Ryder, more than 1,000 people auditioned before Will Brisbin a 15-years old actor from Sherwood Park, Alberta, Canada, got the role.

On July 14, it was announced that Ronan Keating, Richard Arnold, Sam Faiers and Tom Fletcher were added to the cast as part of the voice cameos for the dubs in the UK and Ireland.

During an interview with Collider, Brunker spoke about enjoying the voice cast overall. "The core cast of pups and Ryder are all kids, and that was new for us and really wonderful. We really worked with them to try to get true, meaningful performances out of all the characters, and I thought they did an amazing job. The character of Chase, played by Iain [Armitage], goes on such a wonderful emotional journey that’s a little bit unexpected, and he just brought so much to it. He broke our hearts in some moments. You really end up rooting for him. In terms of improvisation, I would say Marsai's deliveries were the things that were most surprising. She almost couldn’t do anything bad. When we were going through the takes, it was like, “This is great. This is great in a different way. And this is great in a different way.” She was wonderful and brought so much energy to it. Everybody was wonderful. Dax [Shepard] is the nicest guy, who was game on for everything. Tyler Perry was thrilled to be a part of it. His son is a big fan, and he certainly loves to improvise and do lots of takes. We couldn't have had a better cast or a better experience for recording them."

In an interview with Screen Rant, Iain Armitage spoke about the film and how he aspires to be like his canine counterpart Chase, ahead of the film's home entertainment release. He stated about the film's main character, "Chase is a fun, funny, smart, brave, loyal dog. And he's a police dog, and he's sort of the, I don't think he's the head of the team, but he's really on top of things. I think he's very cool under pressure. He's very helpful. And he always loves to help other people. And he's always very kind, which I think is very important. And I think I try to be like him in everyday life. I don't always succeed, but I try."

According to Armitage, "The cool thing about voice-over is, you can't convey things with your body because, of course, they don't see it. So you sort of have to have everything that you're going to be doing for the character come through in your voice, which is hard, but it's also kind of fun. It's a fun challenge, but on the upside, you can show up to work in pajamas, and they won't get mad at you. So that balances out. But I think just trying to really bring emotion into my voice in some of those scenes and to really make it clear that I care about Ryder [Will Brisbin] and my fellow pups on the team."

Writing
On February 21, 2020, Bob Barlen announced that he would co-write the screenplay with Billy Frolick. Director Cal Brunker, who also wrote the film along with his childhood friend Bob Barlen and Billy Frolick, came to the film with a solid understanding of the characters thanks to his own kids.

Screenwriter Barlen described the main character to be focused on in the film: 

Brunker adds, "At its core, the movie is about what it means to be scared, and how to overcome your fears. It felt really important to be doing something that we could share with people at this time as the movie comes out. I think people are coming out of this time of fear and uncertainty, and I think the movie has a lot to say about that. And we really feel proud that hopefully this is going to be one of the first movies that people get to see in theaters again."

The film also represented the fulfillment of a lifetime dream for Bob Barlen and Cal Brunker, who had been making films together for decades. Brunker had known Barlen since they attended high school, and would make films with him later into their respective careers: "Back before we ever got a chance to make a movie, Bob and I went to Hollywood for the first time, and we actually paid to go on the Paramount lot tour. You know, you get to see behind the gates. We said to each other, wouldn't it be amazing if one day we were making a movie for Paramount? Well, we’re six or seven weeks away from our first movie for Paramount coming out. And to be entrusted with such a beloved brand for so many people and to be able to share that with the world, this is a dream come true for us. It's been something we’ve been working towards for a long time and, and it's a real gift."

Animation
On November 8, 2019, it was announced that Mikros Image in Montreal would handle the animation. There are 250 filmmakers with a team of about 60 devoted to the animation. Their biggest challenge was creating high-quality theatrical animation that didn't lose the style of the series. They were also especially interested in creating action scenes that had more of a realistic quality.

While they wanted to focus on the backstory of one character, it was also important to them to add a new female pup to the crew, since the character Skye is usually the only female on the team. New pups often appear in the series for a specific adventure to round out the team, but then are not necessarily in every episode going forward.

Barlen stated about adding a new pup to the film: "For us, in terms of actually creating Liberty, it was really fun because one of the nice things was that we were able to create a character that maybe was a bit different than the other pups. All the pups in the PAW Patrol are perfect and they're great. They’re a certain way, but Liberty has got a little bit of an edge to her, which is nice. Having her experience and seeing her experiencing the film from her point of view, as she relates to the PAW Patrol, is really fun. And then, in terms of Marsai Martin who plays her, she’s such an incredible actress. It was such a gift that she agreed to do it because she really brings the character to life. We couldn’t imagine her being played in a better way by a better character, so we were really looking to have her on." Brunker says that Liberty is a new character, which allows them to write differently for her than the other pups. They also knew when she grow up in Adventure City, it justifies her having a little bit 'thicker' skin and a tougher way of talking. He stated that it is fun to juxtapose with the attitudes that the other people used to from the regular core team of pups.

Brunker stated: "For me, it started really young with drawing and being a visual thinker and expressing myself visually. The idea of being able to create almost anything you can imagine in animation is something that I find incredibly attractive..." while Barlen agrees, saying, "One of the nice things about animated movies, just from growing up on animated films and loving them well past when I was grown, is that it’s so many people coming together and being able to make a film on a large scale that goes out so wide across the world. One of the exciting things about being a filmmaker is that your work is seen by hundreds of thousands or millions of people. Animation allows us to work at a scale where we can do something spectacular and really special on screen."

"My daughter is a huge Skye fan," says Brunker. "She was four when we started making this movie. So, we wanted to give Skye some really big, exciting moments. We also felt, just in terms of bringing something fresh and new to the team, a new girl pup would be wonderful. Because she's new for the movie, we wanted to make her stand out. We thought that because she was from the city we could make her a little tougher, a little more rough around the edges than the other pups are, and that would bring something fresh to that world as well."

Dodge and Brunker both thought the style of the animation needed to remain true to the series, but with some significant adjustments to give it a more theatrical feel. According to Brunker, they wanted to redesign some things noticed in the movie: "The back legs of the dogs actually look and function like real dog legs and in the TV show they're kind of more cartoony; just kind of stick legs. We felt it would allow them to move more like real dogs, and if we could push the realism of the movement, then it would make the fact that they're doing these great big rescues and all this heroic stuff even more exciting."

At a reported budget of $26 million, the CGI animation is more polished and textured than the series, with Brunker and his team reshaping and rebuilding every character, vehicle and environment from scratch. Aside from some voice recording in Los Angeles (including recordings from most of the cast remotely) and orchestral scoring in Nashville, “95 percent of everything” happened in Canada, according to Brunker.

Music
Heitor Pereira composed the music for the film. He previously collaborated with director Brunker on The Nut Job 2: Nutty by Nature. On June 2, 2021, it was confirmed that Maroon 5 lead singer Adam Levine had provided an original song, titled "Good Mood". It was written by Shellback, Savan Kotecha, Oscar Görres and Adam Levine; Shellback and 
Oscar Görres are the producers, while Savan Kotecha serves as the executive producer. The track was officially released on August 6, and sent to Italian radio on October 1, 2021.

Another song, titled "The Use in Trying", was announced on August 2, 2021, as well as the official release on August 10, co-written by Alessia Cara (who performs the track) and Jon Levine, who additionally serves as producer. Levine stated that "her one-of-a-kind voice weaves a beautiful song that captures the sadness and uncertainty during a pinnacle moment in the film".

Original songs performed for the film include:

Release

Theatrical and streaming
During Spin Master's first quarter 2019 earnings conference call, an animated theatrical film based on the series was announced to be "in the works" with an August 2021 theatrical release date. On April 24, 2020, the film's theatrical release was announced to be August 20, 2021. The film was also available to stream on Paramount+ in the U.S. on the same day it released in theaters. Because Canadian distribution is handled by Elevation Pictures, the Canadian version of Paramount+ did not initially offer the movie, and it is unknown if it will.

In July 2021, Paramount Pictures UK and Ireland announced that the film would be released in British and Irish theatres on August 9, 2021. This version also retained the voice actors of the British dub.

The film had its red carpet premiere at the Vue Leicester Square in London on August 8, 2021. PAW Patrol: The Movie was released in China on January 14, 2022.

Marketing
By October 2020, the number of UK marketing partners have signed to promote PAW Patrol: The Movie. It includes Spin Master, Play by Play, Crayola, VTech, Sambro, RMS International, Kiddieland, Blues, Fashion UK, Aykroyd TDP, Amscan, Character World, Worlds Apart, Kinnerton, Seabrook, Yoplait, Beiersdorf, Signature Gifts, Egmont, Danilo, and DNC. On April 26, 2021, it was announced that Jakks Pacific and Disguise acquired the new rights as the toy and costume partner based on the film. The Halloween costumes and accessories from Disguise was available online, at retailers and Halloween specialty stores was also available this fall 2021.

On June 30, 2021, Mattel purchased rights to create a selection of items under its Mega Bloks and Uno brands which include more than 10 products featuring the characters from the film. The line of products was available in fall 2021.

A series of books based on the film was published on July 13, 2021. A line of action figures and toys collection by Spin Master was released on August 1, 2021, after July 15 presale. In June 2021, PetPlate announced its partnership for the launch of the film.

In July, Marston's made a deal with Paramount Pictures to launch the exclusive meal deal and collectible mask offer across 270 pubs ahead of the film release in the UK. The kids' meal deal offer ran throughout August, and it also includes the merchandise, such as six collectible character masks and activity sheets. Additional marketing partners for the film included Build-A-Bear, Hasbro, Kellogg's, Campbell's, Kraft Heinz, and Random House Children's Books, while ViacomCBS has partnered with retailers such as Walmart, Target, Amazon, Kroger, and LIDL.

Home media
Paramount Home Entertainment released PAW Patrol: The Movie on digital on September 21, 2021, then on DVD and Blu-ray on November 2, 2021.
 The digital release features hours of entertainment with exclusive bonus content, including a look at the team, additional news reports with reporter Marty Muckraker (voiced by Jimmy Kimmel) and a sing-along with a reimagined PAW Patrol theme song lyric video. It also includes the bonus episodes with one never-before-seen episode from the popular Nickelodeon series, and a never-before-seen episode of Blaze and the Monster Machines. When the film was released on disc, it entered the national NPD VideoScan First Alert sales chart at No. 2, debuting at No. 3 on the dedicated Blu-ray Disc chart.

Television broadcasts
PAW Patrol: The Movie aired on Nickelodeon US on November 18, 2022. Following its debut, PAW Patrol: The Movie encored on the following Saturday (Nov. 19) and Sunday (Nov. 20).

Reception

Box office
PAW Patrol: The Movie grossed $40.1 million in the United States and Canada, and $104.2 million in other territories, for a worldwide total of $144.3 million.

In the United States and Canada, PAW Patrol: The Movie was released alongside Reminiscence, The Night House, and The Protégé as well as the limited release of Flag Day and was initially projected to gross around $7–9 million from 3,184 theaters in its opening weekend. After making $4.5 million on its first day, estimates were increased to $12–14 million. It went on to debut to $13 million, finishing second behind holdover Free Guy; 88% of the audience was made up of families, 63% being under the age of 25. The opening was noteworthy because Regal Cinemas, the second-largest chain in the U.S., refused to carry the film due to its day-and-date release. The film fell 50% in its second weekend to $6.6 million, finishing in third. It then made $4 million in its third weekend, declining 40% and finishing in fifth place.

Worldwide, PAW Patrol: The Movie debuted in six markets, making $5.8 million in its first weekend, including a $2.3 million opening in France and a $3.2 million opening in the United Kingdom. In its second weekend, the film made $12.8 million in 39 markets; the top countries were Germany ($2.6 million), the Netherlands ($1.1 million), Mexico ($864,000), France, and the United Kingdom. It also had a South Korean opening in a mere 240 theaters, a decision by the Korea Theater Association to release local titles instead. In its third, the film was screened in 46 markets and grossed $10.3 million, which included #1 openings in Spain, Argentina, and Chile.

Critical response
The website's critical consensus reads: "No job's too big and no pup's too small for PAW Patrol: The Movie, which should give its youthful target demographic exactly what they're looking for." On Metacritic, the film has a weighted average score of 50 out of 100, based on 14 critics, indicating "mixed or average reviews". Audiences polled by CinemaScore gave the film an average grade of "A−" on an A+ to F scale, while PostTrak reported 81% of audience members gave it a positive score, with 66% saying they would definitely recommend it.

Randy Myers of The Mercury News gave the film three stars out of four and said, "This old-fashioned, G-rated animated children's film (young children, that is, not teens or tweens) does everything it intends to do. And does it well." Kristen Page-Kirby of The Washington Post gave two and a half stars out of four and said, "A better movie than it needs to be, with some neat visuals, an outstanding score and a story that, while simple, is well told." Glenn Kenny of The New York Times called the film, "Entirely toddler-friendly and irony-free."

Nate Adams of The Only Critic gave the film a B, and wrote in his review, "I think three to six-year-olds are going to wince with glee at the sight of their favorite puppers saving the day, but the parents who are forced to go along for the ride will appreciate the film's cheery sense of humor and educational elements." Lisa Giles-Keddie of HeyUGuys gave the film four stars out of five and said, "A relentlessly entertainment big screen outing for the familiar pups. A perfect slice of summer cinema for all the family." James Mottram of South China Morning Post gave the film three stars out of five, saying "Paw Patrol: The Movie is a solidly entertaining film for kids, with plenty of crash-bang action."

Nell Minow of RogerEbert.com gave the film two and a half stars out of four, saying "Parents will appreciate the way the pups tackle problem-solving, working together to make the best use of each character's talents." Courtney Howard of Variety found that, "Any crass consumerism is eclipsed by disarming, demonstrable themes and meaningful sentiments woven throughout the film's textured fabric." Yolanda Machado of TheWrap gave the film a positive review, stating "Brunker and his co-writers find a way to deliver a multi-layered story that can grab toddlers while keeping older viewers entertained and not groaning at some propagandized messaging." Frank Scheck of The Hollywood Reporter called the film, "Harmless fun for its target audience."

However, some critics were critical in the film for lazy and lackluster writing, poor pacing and focusing too much on the franchise's merchandising arm. Sarah Bea Milner of Screen Rant gave the film a negative review, saying, "Paw Patrol has enough action to keep young fans entertained, but parents will likely be bored by the dragging pace and convoluted plot." Jude Dry of IndieWire gave the film a D, and wrote in her review, "While it's doubtful the humorless dirge of a movie will make enough of an impression to mold young minds in any lasting way, the critique of PAW Patrol is useful as an amalgamation of certain favorite Hollywood themes that ought to be retired."

Writing for The A.V. Club, Jesse Hassenger criticized the film's merchandise and gave the film a C− saying, "The film version feels most energized when it's amping up to sell toys: fetishizing the clicking of plastic into plastic, and supersizing the characters' armor and vehicles with a deranged zeal matched only by real police departments around the country." Writing for Los Angeles Times, Michael Ordoña criticized the film for writing under the parents despite 'its awesomeness' for very young audiences. He stated, "To very young kids who like cartoon dogs driving shiny vehicles, "PAW Patrol: The Movie" may be awesome. To grown-ups, it may be an aggressively under-written, 88-minute toy commercial." He felt that the voice actors were "unremarkable" and the original songs breaks, including brightly "colored tunes" of Adam Levine and Alessia Cara. The issue about the dialogue that he believe in Adventure City was fairly represented by the line: "Where is it? There's so many buildings. I wonder which one it is."

Accolades

Other media

Video game
A video game based on the film was announced on June 10, 2021, titled PAW Patrol The Movie: Adventure City Calls. Developed by Drakhar Studio and published by Outright Games, it was released for PlayStation 4, Xbox One, Nintendo Switch, Microsoft Windows and Stadia on August 13, 2021. The game received mixed reviews. It was the third video game based on the series overall; this game is set before the events of the film where the pups including Chase, Skye, Marshall and the new city girl Liberty embarks on a mission to save Adventure City from Mayor Humdinger who becomes a mayor in a buzzing metropolis with his selfish scheming. Rocky and Zuma are the playable characters, but they are not featured in the box art. While Liberty was not wearing in the box art, she does wear during the games played.

Sequel

In August 2021, director Cal Brunker stated that he would like to make a sequel to the film. "We've certainly thought about it. There are other stories that we would be excited about telling. But for us, it’s really about seeing if people love this one, and then taking it from there."

On November 3, 2021, Spin Master officially announced that a sequel, titled PAW Patrol: The Mighty Movie was in development, with Cal Brunker confirming that he would direct the sequel, while Jennifer Dodge confirmed that she would serve as a producer along with Laura Clunie and Toni Stevens. Taraji P. Henson joined the cast in a new role as a meteor-obsessed mad scientist named Victoria Vance.

On January 25, 2023, the film's voice cast was announced, with actors including Kristen Bell, Christian Convery, Mckenna Grace, Lil Rel Howery, James Marsden, Serena Williams, Alan Kim, Brice Gonzalez, North West, Christian Corrao (reprising his role as the voice of Marshall from the show replacing Kingsley Marshall from the first movie), and Nylan Parthipan. It was also announced that Finn Lee-Epp would replace Will Brisbin as the voice of Ryder and Luxton Handspiker would reprise his role as the voice of Rubble from Rubble & Crew replacing Keegan Hedley from the first movie, and that Marsai Martin, Kim Kardashian, Ron Pardo, and Callum Shoniker would be reprising their roles as Liberty, Delores, Mayor Humdinger, and Rocky. It was additionally announced that Pinar Toprak would compose the film's score, replacing Heitor Pereira.

The sequel is scheduled to be released on September 29, 2023.

Notes

References

External links

2021 films
Canadian animated feature films
Canadian computer-animated films
Animated films based on animated series
Films based on television series
Nickelodeon animated films
Nickelodeon Movies films
Paramount Pictures films
Paramount Pictures animated films
Paramount+ original films
Films scored by Heitor Pereira
Films impacted by the COVID-19 pandemic
2021 computer-animated films
2021 adventure films
2021 comedy films
American computer-animated films
American children's animated action films
American children's animated adventure films
American children's animated comedy films
American children's animated fantasy films
Animated films about dogs
Animated films about children
Animated films about friendship
English-language Canadian films
2020s English-language films
2020s Canadian films
2020s American films